Phantom Gold may refer to:
 Phantom Gold (1936 film), an Australian adventure film
 Phantom Gold (1938 film), an American Western film